Rocky Horror Show Live is a 2015 musical performance event simulcast live to cinemas across the United Kingdom and Europe from London's Playhouse Theatre on 17 September 2015. The Gala performance, in aid of Amnesty International, was the highlight of a two-week run of The Rocky Horror Show at the Playhouse from 11 to 26 September, all featuring the show's creator Richard O'Brien as a narrator.

Cast
Most of the cast appearing in the production have played their particular characters in past productions around the world. The list below is of those who appeared in the television broadcast of the production, including the special celebrity narrators, most of whom have been involved in a production at one time or another.

Release
The Gala performance was broadcast to over 600 cinemas across the UK and Europe; grossing more than £600,000 at the UK box office alone. It beat Legend and Maze Runner: The Scorch Trials to take the top spot at the UK box office.

An edited version was later broadcast on BBC America in the United States, on Sky Arts in the United Kingdom, SBS in Australia, Canal+ Extra in Spain, and on YLE Teema in Finland.

Fans have also been petitioning for a release of the broadcast onto DVD.

References

External links

 
 
 YouTube video for "Time Warp" and Tweet campaign
 Time Warp page for the broadcast

Rocky Horror
Simulcasts
2015 musicals
West End musicals
2010s English-language films